"Lady December" is a 2004 single by The Concretes.

Track listing
Digipack LFS016
"Lady December"
"The Warrior"
"Seems Fine Shuffle"

Charts

References

2006 singles
2004 singles
2004 songs